Rajiv Kumar (born 25 May 1989), best known by his stage name Jaani, is an Indian songwriter and music composer associated with Punjabi and Hindi language songs. His notable songs "Naah", "Kya Baat Ay", "Pachtaoge" , "Filhall", "Titliyaan", "Baarish Ki Jaaye" and "Filhaal2 Mohabbat".

Personal life
Jaani was born on 25 May 1988. He is from Gidderbaha a town near Bhatinda in Punjab, India and holds a diploma in hotel management. Jaani married Neha Chauhan on 25 November 2008.

Career
Jaani started his career with a religious song, "Sant Sipahi", in 2012. However, he gained fame after song "Soch", sung by Hardy Sandhu and composed by B Praak. The music video of this song was directed by Arvindr Khaira. A Hindi version of "Soch" was released as well as an English recreation of soch with the name 'Without You (Soch)' was produced by T-Series which featured English vocals as well as music and English lyrics by Vaibhav Saxena.

Since "Soch", B Praak, Jaani, Arvindr Khaira, and Harrdy Sandhu have worked as a team, producing Punjabi songs, such as "Joker", "Backbone", "HornBlow", "Naah", "Yaar Ni Mileya" and "Kya Baat Ayy". His album Shayar with composer B Praak released in 2015, which includes tracks like "Taara" by Ammy Virk, "Ik Saal" by Jassie Gill and "Naa Ji Naa" by Hardy Sandhu. 

He has started his own music label known as Desi Melodies with filmmaker Arvindr Khaira and musician B Praak.

In 2021, he made his screen debut as an actor in Jagdeep Sidhu's Punjabi film Qismat 2, with Ammy Virk and Sargun Mehta in lead roles.

Singles/Albums

Albums

Singles

Songs in films

References

External links 

 
 

1989 births
Living people
Indian male songwriters
People from Punjab, India
Punjabi-language lyricists